Vera Viktorovna Rudakova (born 20 March 1992) is a Russian athlete who specialises in the 400 metres hurdles. She won several titles for her country in various junior categories. She reached her first major final at the 2014 European Championships finishing sixth.

Her personal best in the event is 54.42, set in Moscow 2016.

International competitions

References

1992 births
Living people
Russian female hurdlers
European Games competitors for Russia
Athletes (track and field) at the 2019 European Games
World Athletics Championships athletes for Russia
World Athletics U20 Championships winners
World Youth Championships in Athletics winners
Russian Athletics Championships winners
21st-century Russian women